Annika Svahn (fl. 1714), was a Finnish prisoner of war during the Great Northern War. The daughter of a vicar, she became the perhaps most well known victim of the abuse suffered by the civilian population in Finland during the Russian occupation Greater Wrath.

Annika Svahn was the daughter of the vicar in Joutseno, Benjamin Swahn. After the death of her father in 1701, when she was very young, her mother was allowed to remain in the vicarage as the house keeper of her father's successor, and she worked there as a maid. In midsummer 1710, Svahn was abducted naked from her sauna by a group of Russian soldiers and brought as a slave to Saint Petersburg. In Saint Petersburg, she, as well as a couple of other Finnish females, were given some military training. In 1713, she was re-baptized in the Russian orthodox faith as Uliana. She was given a dragoon uniform and, alongside other Finnish women with a similar history, she was ordered to Finland to assist the Russian army in its conquest of Swedish Finland. She was wounded by a bullet in her thigh outside Borgå in 1714. The same year, she was given the task to act as a messenger for the Russians. She planned to desert, but was captured by the Swedish army on her way. She made her confession for the Swedish army authorities, who documented it. It is not known what happened to her after this.

See also
 Lovisa von Burghausen
 Afrosinya

References
 Suomen kansallisbiografia (National Biography of Finland)
 https://web.archive.org/web/20121101153825/http://lappeenranta.fi/Suomeksi/Palvelut/Kirjasto/Etela-Karjala-aineisto/Joutsenolaisia_tarinoita/Annikka_Swahn%2C_tsaarin_rakuuna.iw3

18th-century Finnish people
Finnish women in war
Swedish people of the Great Northern War
Finnish prisoners of war
Women in 18th-century warfare
Russian serfs
Russian military personnel of the Great Northern War
18th-century Finnish women
18th-century slaves